The following is the Bulgarian order of battle at the start of the Second Balkan War as of .  This order of battle includes all combat units, including engineer and artillery units, but not medical, supply, signal, border guard and garrison units.

Background
During First Balkan War Bulgaria mobilized 599,878 men out of a total male population of 1,914,160. Final victory  over the Ottoman Empire however came at the cost of some 33,000 killed and 50,000 wounded soldiers while many others were affected by the spread of cholera and dysentery. With the end of the war the relations between the members of the Balkan League deteriorated rapidly due to the unresolved problem of the division of  the conquered lands which forced Bulgaria to transfer its armies from Thrace to Macedonia.

On the eve of the outbreak of the Second Balkan War the field forces of the Bulgarian Army were deployed in five armies along a 500 kilometer front from the Danube to the Aegean Sea. Despite all the measures taken by the military authorities, including the drafting of young Bulgarian men aged 20–26 years living in the newly occupied territories in Thrace and
Macedonia, the number of mobilized personnel reached a total of 500,491 men. Thus for the war against its former allies Bulgaria could rely on manpower that was about 83% of the one available during the First Balkan War.

The Bulgarian command deployed five field armies against Serbia and Greece while it kept minimal forces near the Ottoman border and no forces at all on the Romanian border. Besides the 11 infantry division, 1 cavalry division and the Macedonian-Adrianopolitan Volunteer Corps the high command also raised two additional infantry divisions(12th and 13th) and one independent infantry brigade. Many of the old divisions however had at least one of their infantry brigades taken away and attached to the field armies as independent units which created logistical difficulties. Thus it seemed the Bulgarian GHQ was attempting to provide greater numbers of available units while disregarding the quality of some of those units. As a result, the total strength of the field forces was increased to around 297 infantry battalions, 47 cavalry squadrons and 186 artillery batteries.

The material situation of the armed forces was improved compared to the first war. The number of available horses was increased by 12,594 to 97,456 while the number of rifles increased by 44,561 to 378,996 and artillery guns by 112 to 1228. Still according to the mobilization plans of the General Staff the army was supposed to have 483,674 rifles and 117,733 which showed that, like the manpower deficit, the material shortages had not been dealt with by the time the war began.

GHQ
The nominal commander in chief of the Bulgarian Army was Tsar Ferdinand I but de facto its control and leadership were initially in the hands of his deputy Lieutenant-General Mihail Savov. The Chief of the General Staff Major-General Ivan Fichev opposed the war and was officially in resignation, though de facto he was never dismissed, while his functions were carried out by the Deputy Chief of Staff Colonel Stefan Nerezov . Other notable changes in the command structure took place almost immediately after the outbreak of the war when General Savov was fired as deputy of the commander-in-chief, although he latter returned to take command of the combined 5th, 4th and 2nd armies. Ferdinand chose the  Russophile  General Dimitriev as his deputy while General Racho Petrov assumed command of the 3rd Army.

Order of battle

Operating against the Serbian Army

First Army
First Army was commanded by Lieutenant-General Vasil Kutinchev.

 5th Danube Infantry Division
 1st Brigade
 2nd "Iskar" Infantry Regiment
 5th "Danube" Infantry Regiment
 2nd Brigade
 18th "Etarski" Infantry Regiment
 20th "Dobruja" Infantry Regiment
1st QF FAR
1st FAR
5th Pioneer Battalion
 9th Pleven Infantry Division
 1st Brigade
 4th "Pleven" Infantry Regiment
 17th "Dorostol" Infantry Regiment
 2nd Brigade
 33rd "Svishtov" Infantry Regiment
 34th "Troyan" Infantry Regiment
9th QF FAR
9th Pioneer Battalion
 Independent Infantry Brigade
 65th Infantry Regiment
 66th Infantry Regiment
1/8 Artillery Section
Army Troops
 two cavalry squadrons

Third Army
Third Army was commanded by Lieutenant-General Radko Dimitriev.

 1st Sofia Infantry Division
 1st Brigade Colonel
 1st "Sofia" Infantry Regiment
 6th "Turnovo" Infantry Regiment
 2nd Brigade (Major-General
 37th Infantry Regiment
 38th Infantry Regiment
4th QF FAR
4th FAR
1st Pioneer Battalion
 13th Infantry Division
 62nd Infantry Regiment
 63rd Infantry Regiment
 64th Infantry Regiment
13th FAR
 3/5 Infantry Brigade
 45th Infantry Regiment
 46th Infantry Regiment
1/1 Artillery Section
Cavalry Division
 1st Brigade
 1st Cavalry Regiment
 Leib Guard Cavalry Regiment
 2nd Brigade
 2nd Cavalry Regiment
 7th Cavalry Regiment
 5/5 Artillery Battery
Army Troops
 3rd Cavalry Regiment
 Army Artillery

Fifth Army
Fifth Army was commanded by Major-General Stefan Toshev.

 4th Preslav Infantry Division
 1st Brigade
 7th "Preslav" Infantry Regiment
 19th "Shumen" Infantry Regiment
 3rd Brigade
 43rd Infantry Regiment
 44th Infantry Regiment
5th QF FAR
5th FAR
4th Pioneer Battalion
 12th Infantry Division
 59th  Infantry Regiment
 60th Infantry Regiment
 61st  Infantry Regiment
12th FAR
 Odrin Brigade
 71st Infantry Regiment
 72nd Infantry Regiment
 2/10 Artillery Section
Army Troops
 6th Cavalry Regiment
 Army Artillery

Fourth Army
Fourth Army was commanded by Major-General Stiliyan Kovachev.

 2nd Thracian Infantry Division
 1st Brigade
 9th "Plovdiv" Infantry Regiment
 21st "Srednogorian" Infantry Regiment
2nd Brigade
 28th "Stremski" Infantry Regiment
 27th "Chepinski" Infantry Regiment
 3rd Brigade
 39th  Infantry Regiment
 40th Infantry Regiment
3rd QF FAR
3rd MAR
2nd Pioneer Battalion
 7th Rila Infantry Division
 1st Brigade
 13th "Rila" Infantry Regiment
 28th "Pernik" Infantry Regiment
 2nd Brigade
 14th "Macedonian" Infantry Regiment
 22nd "Thracian" Infantry Regiment
 3rd Brigade
 49th Infantry Regiment
 50th Infantry Regiment
7th QF FAR
9th FAR
1/2 Mountain Artillery Section
7th Pioneer Battalion
 8th Tundzha Infantry Division
 1st Brigade
 12th "Balkan" Infantry Regiment
 23rd "Shipka" Infantry Regiment
 2nd Brigade
 10th "Rhodope" Infantry Regiment
 30th "Sheinovo" Infantry Regiment
 3rd Brigade
 51st Infantry Regiment
 52nd Infantry Regiment
8th FAR
2/1 Artillery Section
8th Pioneer Battalion
 1/3 Infantry Brigade
 1st "Sofia" Infantry Regiment
 6th "Turnovo" Infantry Regiment
1/6 Artillery Section
 2/4 Infantry Brigade
 8th "Primorski" Infantry Regiment
 31st "Varna" Infantry Regiment
2/5 Artillery Section
 Macedonian-Adrianopolitan Volunteer Corps
 1st Brigade
 1st "Debar" Infantry Battalion
 2nd "Skopie" Infantry Battalion
 3rd "Solun" Infantry Battalion
 4th "Bitolia" Infantry Battalion
13th "Kukush" Infantry Battalion
 2nd Brigade
 5th "Odrin" Infantry Battalion
 6th "Ohrid" Infantry Battalion
 7th "Kumanovo" Infantry Battalion
 8th "Kostur" Infantry Battalion
 14th "Voden"  Infantry Battalion
 3rd Brigade
 9th "Veles" Infantry Battalion
 10th "Prilep" Infantry Battalion
 11th "Serres" Infantry Battalion
 12th "Lozengrad" Infantry Battalion
 15th "Shtip "  Infantry Battalion
2/8 Artillery Section
2/2 QF Mountain Artillery Section
3/2 QF Mountain Artillery Section
4/2 Mountain Artillery Section
Army Troops
 5th Cavalry Regiment
 7th Opalchenie  Regiment

Operating against the Greek Army

Second Army
Second Army was commanded by Lieutenant-General Nikola Ivanov.

 3rd Balkan Infantry Division
 2nd Brigade
 29th "Yambol" Infantry Regiment
 32nd "Zagora" Infantry Regiment
 3rd Brigade
 41st Infantry Regiment
 42nd Infantry Regiment
6th QF FAR
6th FAR
3rd Pioneer Battalion
 11th Infantry Division
 55th Infantry Regiment
 56th Infantry Regiment
 57th Infantry Regiment
11th FAR
 1/10 Infantry Brigade
 16th "Lovech" Infantry Regiment
 25th "Dragoman" Infantry Regiment
3/10 Artillery Section
 Serres Infantry Brigade
 67th  Infantry Regiment
 68th  Infantry Regiment
1/1 Artillery Section
 Drama Infantry Brigade
 69th  Infantry Regiment
 70th  Infantry Regiment
2/7 Artillery Section
Army Troops
 7th Replacement Infantry Regiment
 10th Cavalry Regiment
 5th Border Guards Battalion
 1st, 3rd, 5th, 6th, 7th, 8th, 10th Replacement Cavalry Squadrons
 2/8 QF Howitzer Section

Reserve of the High Command
 6th Bdin Infantry Division
 1st Brigade
 3rd "Bdin" Infantry Regiment
 15th "Lom" Infantry Regiment
 2nd Brigade
 35th "Vratsa" Infantry Regiment
 36th "Kozloduy" Infantry Regiment
2nd QF FAR
6th Pioneer Battalion

Forces in Eastern Thrace
 2/10 Infantry Brigade
 47th Infantry Regiment
 48th Infantry Regiment
 two cavalry squadrons
 1/2 Artillery Section
 9th Cavalry Regiment
 8th Cavalry Regiment
 58th Infantry Regiment

Notes
Footnotes

Citations

References
 
 
 

Second Balkan War
Military history of Bulgaria
Balkan Wars orders of battle